Marko Radulović may refer to:

 Marko Radulović (water polo) (born 2001), Serbian water polo player
 Marko Radulović (politician) (1866–1932), Montenegrin politician